The Suburban Club is a historic clubhouse at 6 Suburban Avenue/580 Main Street in Stamford, Connecticut.  It is a three-story brick structure, topped by a flat roof that has a parapet and balustrade ringing it on three sides.  The interior features elegant woodwork.  The building was one of the first commissions by architects George F. Shepard and Frederick B. Stearns) who worked together until 1950 on many projects.  It is architecturally significant as a Neo-Federal work in Stamford, and historically significant as one of the few buildings of the period to survive in downtown Stamford.  The Suburban Club, founded in 1890, was a major social center for the city's elite until its closing in 1935.

The building was listed on the National Register of Historic Places in 1989.

See also
National Register of Historic Places listings in Stamford, Connecticut

References

National Register of Historic Places in Fairfield County, Connecticut
Buildings and structures completed in 1914
Buildings and structures in Stamford, Connecticut